Naureen Hassan is an American finance executive who formerly served as the first vice president and chief operating officer of the Federal Reserve Bank of New York. In this capacity, she is also an alternate voting member of the Federal Open Market Committee. She is currently President of UBS Americas and CEO of UBS Americas Holding LLC.

References 

Living people
American chief operating officers
Princeton University alumni
Stanford Graduate School of Business alumni
Manadath family
Year of birth missing (living people)
Federal Reserve Bank of New York
American people of Malayali descent